The Chemical, Energy, Paper, Printing, Wood and Allied Workers' Union (CEPPWAWU) is a trade union representing workers in various industries in South Africa.

The union was formed through the merger of the Chemical Workers' Industrial Union (CWIU) and the Paper, Printing, Wood and Allied Workers' Union (PPWAWU) in 1999. At the time of the merger, the union had 93,000 members, which had fallen to 64,100 members by 2011.

CEPPWAWU is an affiliate of the Congress of South African Trade Unions (COSATU).

Leadership

General Secretaries
1999: Muzi Buthelezi
2002: Welile Nolingo

Presidents
1999: Pasco Dyani
2008: Jacob Mabena
2011: Thamsanqa Mhlongo

References

Trade unions based in Johannesburg
Congress of South African Trade Unions
Manufacturing trade unions
World Federation of Trade Unions
Trade unions in South Africa